Over the course of three weekends in March 1976, the North American Soccer League hosted its second league-wide indoor soccer tournament. Twelve of the twenty NASL teams participated.

Overview
In 1976, instead of playing a full indoor schedule (and despite the hopes of Tampa Bay owner George Strawbridge, Jr.), the North American Soccer League opted to stage a two-tiered indoor tournament for the second consecutive year. Of the league's 20 teams, 12 participated in three regions, which was down from 16 in four regions in the previous year's tournament. The regional winners along with the "best" second-place team would advance to the final four in St. Petersburg, Florida. While the goals remained 4 × 16, the games would be shortened to three 15-minute periods, instead of the 20-minute frames played the previous year. The tournament also saw the first-ever indoor overtime and penalty shootout, as Miami and Boston played to a 6–6 draw in the opening match. After 45 minutes of regulation time and two 5-minute golden goal extra sessions, the match was ultimately decided by spot kicks.

Playing in their home arena, the Bayfront Center, the Tampa Bay Rowdies defeated the Rochester Lancers 6–4 in the Championship Final. Juli Veee of San Jose scored eight goals to lead the tournament, while Clyde Best of Tampa Bay earned the MVP honors.

1976 Indoor Regional tournaments

Eastern Regional
played at the Bayfront Center in St. Petersburg, Florida
 

  

*Tampa Bay wins region, advances to semifinals
East Regional MVP: Stewart Scullion (Tampa Bay) – 3 goals, 1 assist
All-Regional Team: Stojan Trickovic (Washington), John Kerr (Washington), Rodney Marsh (Tampa Bay), Arsène Auguste (Tampa Bay), Stewart Scullion (Tampa Bay), Shep Messing (Boston)

Midwest Regional
played at International Amphitheatre in Chicago, Illinois

*Rochester wins region, advances to semifinals
Midwest Regional MVP: Mario Garcia (Rochester) – 5 goals
All-Regional Team: Mario Garcia (Rochester), Bobby Ranogejec (Chicago), Pat McBride (St. Louis) Jim May (Rochester)

West Regional
played at the Cow Palace in Daly City, California
 

*San Jose wins region on goal differential, while Dallas is the top second-place team in any region, so both advance to semifinals
West Regional MVP: Juli Veee (San Jose) – 5 goals, 5 assists
All-Regional Team: Juli Veee (San Jose), Paul Child (San Jose), Roy Turner (Dallas), David Chadwick (Dallas), Archie Roboostoff (San Diego), Mike Ivanow (San Jose)

1976 Indoor Final Four

Bracket

Semi-finals
played at the Bayfront Center in St. Petersburg, Florida

Third-place match
played at the Bayfront Center in St. Petersburg, Florida

Championship final

1975 NASL Indoor Champions: Tampa Bay Rowdies

Final Four awards
Most Valuable Player: Clyde Best (Tampa Bay) – Games: 4; Goals: 7; Assists: 4 Total points: 18
All-tournament Team: Clyde Best (Tampa Bay), Juli Veee (San Jose), Derek Smethurst (Tampa Bay), João Pedro (Rochester), Stewart Scullion (Tampa Bay), Jim May (Rochester)

Final team rankings
G = Games, W = Wins, L = Losses, GF = Goals For, GA = Goals Against, GD = Goal Differential

Non-tournament matches
In addition to the tournament itself, a few teams staged other indoor matches as tune-ups for both the outdoor season and the indoor tournament itself.

Match reports

References

NASL Indoor seasons
1976 in American soccer
1976 in American soccer leagues
Indoor
NASL Indoor tournament
Sports in St. Petersburg, Florida
Soccer in Florida
1976